William Hole (or Holle) was a skilled English engraver who died in 1624 though the date of his birth is uncertain.  Hole's work suggests French influence.

Career
His first dated plates belong to 1607, among them the title page for a London edition of the Breeches Bible.

For many books, Hole engraved a portrait of the author, such as John Florio's 1611 Italian and English dictionary, George Chapman's 1616 translation of the Iliad, and George Wither's 1617 book of poems. Hole also made maps and travelogue material.

Music engraving
For the publication Parthenia, or The Maydenhead of the First Musicke that ever was Printed for the Virginalls (c.1612), he engraved keyboard music by three English composers, Dr John Bull, William Byrd and Orlando Gibbons.  This was the first time that intaglio copperplate engraving was used for English music scores, although engraved music had been printed on the continent from the late 16th century. This development was particularly important for keyboard music, as movable type was not really suitable for printing keyboard music in standard musical notation.

Legacy
Some of Hole's work is in the British Museum.

References

External links

Examples of William Hole's engravings National Portrait Gallery

Year of birth missing
1624 deaths
English engravers
Music engravers